Kurdistan Region–Palestine relations covers the diplomatic, political, and cultural relations between the semi-autonomous Region of Kurdistan Region with the Palestinian Authority (1994–2012) and the State of Palestine.

The Palestinian Authority has had a diplomatic representation in Kurdistan Region via a General Consulate, and is one of the first Arab governments to have relations with Kurdistan. The president of Kurdistan described the opening of the consulate as "an historical day for the two brotherly and persecuted nations." Ambassador Khudhouri commented "And here today, we are opening this consulate to continue our historical relations."

Political relations. 
The Palestinian Government opened its general consulate in Kurdistan Region on 29 November 2011 in Erbil, Kurdistan Region. Masoud Barzani, President of Kurdistan Region, expressed his hope that the Palestinian General Consulate will lead to more cooperation and visits with the Arab world. Mahmoud Abbas is the first Arab leader to visit Kurdistan Region, and Nadhmi Khudhouri, the Ambassador of Kurdistan, described the opening of the consulate as a "great achievement" for the Palestinian people. The ambassador also said about Israel: "It is only propaganda, those who claim that Kurdistan region has relation with Israel. What I feel here is that Kurds support Palestine."

Cultural relations. 
In April 2012, the Iraqi Kurdistan national football team was invited to participate in the 2012 Palestine International Cup. The KFF held an emergency meeting and eventually decided to let the team participate. Salam Hussein, the KFF Secretary, said  "We finally decided to let the team participate in the Palestine competition after we found out that the competition will not coincide with the VIVA World Cup".

See also. 
Foreign relations of Kurdistan Region

References. 

Bilateral relations of the State of Palestine
Foreign relations of Kurdistan Region